Eldar Hasanov (born October 10, 1955), is an Azerbaijan former Prosecutor General and diplomat who served as Ambassador Extraordinary and Plenipotentiary of Azerbaijan to Serbia, Montenegro, Bosnia and Herzegovina from 2010 to 2020.

Corruption scandal 
Hasanov was recalled from his diplomatic mission in Montenegro, Bosnia and Herzegovina in 2020 by a presidential decree issued by Ilham Aliyev following allegation of corruption against him. After his return home, he was arrested and detained by the operatives of the State Security Service on August 13, 2020. He was arraigned in the Baku Court for Serious Crimes with five charges of misappropriation, legalization of illegally obtained funds, abuse of office, misuse of budget funds and official forgery of the Criminal Code. He was later sent to the Court of Grave Crimes following the completion of investigation where he was reasonably suspected of embezzling budge funds to the tune of 28.3 million euro (US$33.14 million).

References 

Azerbaijani diplomats
1955 births
Living people